Muriel Kovitz C.M. LL.D LRSM (née Libin; February 20, 1926 – May 30, 2021) served as the Chancellor of the University of Calgary in Alberta from 1974 until 1978. She was the first female to hold the position.  Other involvement at the University of Calgary included a member of the Senate (1970) and Chairman of the Senate Executive Committee, a member of the Board of Governors (1972) and a member of the Board of Governors Executive Committee, all prior to being elected as Chancellor.  She is a Chancellor Emeritus of the University of Calgary.

The University of Calgary's Muriel Kovitz Prize, awarded to the University of Calgary graduate with the highest grade point average, is named after her.

The University of Calgary Mace was donated by Muriel and David Kovitz in 1979.

She received her LRSM (Piano) from the Royal Academy of Music in 1944.

She became a Member of the Order of Canada in 1977 and received the Alberta Achievement Award in 1977.

She was the first female director of Imperial Oil appointed in 1975 and was the Chair of the Imperial Oil Charitable Foundation (formed in 1994)

Other corporate directorships included The Reader's Digest Association of Canada Ltd.,  The Institute of Donations and Public Affairs Research, Alberta Investments Ltd., Centennial Packers of Canada Ltd and Murko Investments Ltd.

She was appointed by Prime Minister Pierre Elliot Trudeau as a commissioner of the Federal Government Task Force on Canadian Unity in 1979.

Other volunteer activities included Executive of the Board of Directors of the Canadian Council of Christians and Jews (Western Region); President of the Calgary Section of the National Council of Jewish Women of Canada (1959-1961) and the National Executive Committee (1961-1973); Co-chairman of the Third International Banff Conference on Man and His Environment (1978);  National Chairman of the Sch for Citizen Participation (1967-1973); member of the Calgary Recreation Board (1966-1969); President of the Calgary Social Planning Council (1967-1969); member of the Board of Vocational & Rehabilitation Research Institute of Calgary now known as Vecova (1968-1969); a member of the Calgary Housing Authority (1968-1972); a member of Canadian Medical Association's working group on Ethics in Human Experimentation; Honorary President of the Board of Governors of the Victoria Foundation, Board of Directors of the Greater Victoria Hospital Foundation; Director on the Board of Governors of the Boys and Girl's Club; and a founding board member of Arts Sustainability Victoria.  She was a member of the Alberta Rhodes Scholarship Selection Committee (1976).

References

1926 births
2021 deaths
Canadian university and college chancellors
Members of the Order of Canada
People from Calgary